The Shelford Group is a collaboration of ten of the largest teaching and research NHS hospital trusts in England. The ten members collectively employ over 140,000 people and account for over £12.5 billion of the NHS budget.

The member organisations are:

Cambridge University Hospitals NHS Foundation Trust
Guy's and St Thomas' NHS Foundation Trust
Imperial College Healthcare NHS Trust
King's College Hospital NHS Foundation Trust
Manchester University NHS Foundation Trust
Newcastle upon Tyne Hospitals NHS Foundation Trust
Oxford University Hospitals NHS Foundation Trust
Sheffield Teaching Hospitals NHS Foundation Trust
University College London Hospitals NHS Foundation Trust
University Hospitals Birmingham NHS Foundation Trust

References

External links
 

 
Teaching hospitals in England
National Health Service (England)
2011 establishments in England